Mohammad Nawaz (3 October 1974) is a former Pakistani first-class cricketer who played for Sargodha and Hyderabad cricket teams. He played 51 First-class and 27 List A cricket matches.

References

External links
 

1974 births
Living people
Cricketers from Faisalabad
Hyderabad (Pakistan) cricketers
Faisalabad cricketers
Pakistan Railways cricketers